Ballistic Kiss is a 1998 Hong Kong action thriller film produced and directed by Donnie Yen and starring Yen and Annie Wu.

Plot
Cat (Donnie Yen) is an aimless killer, no matter if its raining or sunny, he would always wear dark glasses and always calls to the radio to talk. Every night, he looks out the window to see his angel living across him, who dances at her room during nighttime. Policewoman Carrie (Annie Wu) also listens to the radio every night and her goal is to arrest a brutal killer. Cat thinks Carrie is his rival Wesley's (Jimmy Wong) girlfriend and abducts her. Going through a theater with a hail of bullets, Cat is surprised to discover that Carrie is the policewoman who has been on his trail. On the other hand, Cat and Wesley were originally FBI officers, however, Wesley's unexpectedly betrayed Cat, which led the latter to the dark world.

Cast
Donnie Yen as Cat Lee
Annie Wu as Carrie
Jimmy Wong as Wesley
Simon Lui as DJ Simon
Yu Rongguang as Hitman (cameo)
Vincent Kok
Lily Chow as Lily
Karen Tong
Felix Lok
John Hau
Conroy Chan
Michael Woods
Vincent Ngan
Andrew Chan as thug
Mak Wai-cheung
Ng Kin-kwok
Kellog Kwok
Ivan Wong as thug
Pinky Yau
Sam Ho as Bodyguard
Tanigaki Kenji
Lam Kwok-kit
Law Wai-kai as thug
Hon Ping
Ippongi Bang

Box office
The film grossed HK$853,735 at the Hong Kong box office during its theatrical run from 21 to 27 March 1998 in Hong Kong.

See also
Donnie Yen filmography

References

External links

Ballistic Kiss at Hong Kong Cinemagic

Ballistic Kiss film review at LoveHKFilm.com

1998 films
1998 action thriller films
1998 crime thriller films
1998 romantic drama films
1998 martial arts films
Hong Kong action thriller films
Hong Kong crime thriller films
Hong Kong romantic drama films
Hong Kong martial arts films
Police detective films
Gun fu films
1990s Cantonese-language films
Golden Harvest films
Films set in Hong Kong
Films shot in Hong Kong
Films set in the United States
Films about contract killing
1990s Hong Kong films